Temesgen Mebrahtu Buru (born 16 November 1994 in Mekelle) is an Ethiopian cyclist.

Major results

2014
 6th Overall Tour of Rwanda
2015
 African Road Championships
3rd  Team time trial
3rd  Under-23 road race
4th Under-23 time trial
2016
 7th Overall Tour of Rwanda
2017
 2nd Time trial, National Road Championships
 4th Road race, African Road Championships
2018
 Africa Cup
3rd Team time trial
5th Time trial
8th Road race
 3rd Time trial, National Road Championships
2019
 National Road Championships
2nd Time trial
2nd Road race
 African Road Championships
3rd  Team time trial
6th Time trial
 6th Road race, African Games

References

External links

1994 births
Living people
Ethiopian male cyclists
Sportspeople from Tigray Region
Competitors at the 2019 African Games
African Games competitors for Ethiopia
20th-century Ethiopian people
21st-century Ethiopian people